Gratis Internet is a Washington, D.C.-based referral marketing company that rewards customers with products of high-demand such as the iPod and PlayStation 3. In 2004 it became a member of the Inc. 500; while in 2005 Gratis broke into the top twenty at eighteen. Its name comes from the Latin word Gratis, meaning free of charge.

History

Gratis Internet was established in 2001. Since July 2004, it has launched a number of Web sites offering free merchandise, most notably iPods, to users who register and complete membership requirements.

Although the word "free" is used prominently, would-be members seeking to complete an offer to qualify for the free merchandise are often given a number of options, some of which involve signing up and paying for a service or subscription. Gratis has launched its Web sites in the United States, United Kingdom, Canada, Germany, and Australia.

Gratis's revenue in 2004 was US$20.5 million, according to Inc.com. Inc.com also reported that Gratis Internet had only 12 employees.

In August 2005, Gratis Internet's multiple sites, including the original FreeCondoms.com and FreeIpods.com, were branded under the FreePay name.

In March 2006, New York Attorney General Eliot Spitzer filed suit against the company, alleging that it sold personal information obtained from millions of consumers despite a strict promise of confidentiality. The suit followed a $1.1 million settlement by Datran Media, which had obtained 7.2 million names, e-mail addresses, home phone numbers, and street addresses from Gratis Internet. Gratis co-founder Peter Martin disputed that his company ever sold or rented out customer information, saying that it hired Datran Media to work on creative design and back-office support for its e-mail marketing campaigns.

In May 2006, Gratis Internet announced new terms of service, allowing users only three months to complete an offer and refer five friends.

In February 2010, a Gratis Internet spinout called Social Cash, an advertising network for Facebook applications, was purchased by LifeStreet Media, of San Carlos, Calif., for an undisclosed sum.

Complaints
In September 2004, the company was criticized by customers for failing to ship iPods, and for inundating them with additional spam e-mail. The company said it was shipping iPods, but that they could not get enough from Apple Computer to fill the demand. The co-founders, Peter Martin and Rob Jewell, denied giving customer e-mail information to third-party companies, but admitted customers do receive a small number of messages from select parties. "We warn our users they may get some messages from our marketing partners", Jewell said.

As of November 2008, the company has an unsatisfactory record with the Better Business Bureau due to unanswered complaints. In the 36 months prior to November 2008, the Bureau had processed 848 complaints about Gratis Internet.

FreePay process 

In order to receive the advertised "free gift" at each of Gratis' websites, a visitor is required to register and complete one affiliate offer. Affiliates include AOL, Blockbuster, RealNetworks, casino and credit card offers, and others. The affiliate offers typically consist of trial memberships, service subscriptions, credit card applications and the like; some require credit cards during registration, and a few involve payment of some kind, causing critics to claim the "free" label a misnomer.

The visitor is then required to refer a set number of people, which varies by the product (the number required is usually the MSRP of the gift divided by US$50). A valid referral is one which has both completed registration via a referral link and signed up for an affiliate offer. Each referral must be a unique user or the account will be "put on hold" during the approval process. Because sponsors must acknowledge the completion of their offer, they are willing to invest more for each referral than they might for other, more traditional forms of advertising.

The advertisers pay Gratis for the referral, between $25 and $90, though the company has not released information as to specific numbers. For example: assuming the MSRP of an iPod is $250, five affiliate signups (the number needed for one user to redeem a free iPod) nets Gratis between $150 and $540. Per the program's terms, Gratis does not need to deliver an iPod to any member with four or fewer referrals.

Since Gratis Internet was created similar companies have been created offering similar incentives for completed offers. Gratis Internet and its initial service, FreeCondoms.com are credited with creating the incentive marketing industry.

See also
Free lunch
Tanstaafl

References

Incentive marketing companies
Companies established in 2001